Slap-Happy Pappy is a Warner Brothers Looney Tunes theatrical cartoon, starring Porky Pig. It was directed by Bob Clampett, written by Warren Foster, and scored by Carl W. Stalling. The short was released on April 13, 1940.

Plot
Porky owns a farm. The cartoon starts with him plowing the fields. But the bulk of the cartoon is about the poultry farm. A sign reads, "Miracle Eggs for sale, if it's a good egg it's a miracle egg". A rabbit impersonating Jack Benny (Jack Bunny) looks at eggs. He is about to smash a black egg, but it breaks and a black bird emerges (doing an impersonation of Rochester).

The scene then cuts to the Eddie Cackler family (based on Eddie Cantor). The family wants a son, but is having no luck. Five eggs hatch and not a single one of them is a boy. A Bing Crosby lookalike happens to be near by holding a stroller that has babies all of which are boys. The father asks him what his secret is, and he croons to a chick who then lays dozen of eggs, all of whom are boys.

Eddie tries the same thing to his wife, and she lays an egg, labeled "JR." (junior). The two are dancing when Eddie asks if the baby could really be a boy. He then says, shrugging, "Mmmm, could be!"

References

External links

1940 animated films
1940 films
1940s American animated films
Cultural depictions of Bing Crosby
Films scored by Carl Stalling